Kim Chang-ju (born 1972) is a South Korean film editor and director. He started working in editing department of 2005 film Welcome to Dongmakgol. He edited films with  directors Bong Joon-ho (Snowpiercer (2013)), Kim Seong-hun (A Hard Day (2014) and Tunnel (2016)), Park Hee-gon (Fengshui), Park Hoon-jung (V.I.P. (2017), The Witch: Part 1. The Subversion (2018)) and Cheon Myeong-kwan (Hot Blooded (2022)) among others. As of May 2022, Kim has edited more than 60 films and 2 TV series Athena: Goddess of War (2010), Kingdom (2019–20). Kim made his directorial debut in 2021 thriller film Hard Hit.

He has won Grand Bell Awards and Blue Dragon Film Awards for Best Editing for films Snowpiercer (2013) and A Hard Day (2014) respectively.

Filmography 
As director

As editor and in editing department

Awards and nominations

References

External links 
 
 
 Kim Chang-ju at Daum (Korean)
 Kim Chang-ju at KMDb (Korean)

Living people
People from Busan
South Korean film editors
South Korean film directors
1972 births